A habendum clause is a clause in a deed or lease that defines the type of interest and rights to be enjoyed by the grantee or lessee.  

In a deed, a habendum clause usually begins with the words "to have and to hold". This phrase is the translation of the Latin  that historically commenced these clauses in deeds. Technically speaking, the "to have" is separate from the "to hold", such that the tenendum clause is sometimes considered a separate concept. Historically, the habendum clause dealt with "the quantity of interest or estate which the grantee was to have in the property granted", while the tenendum clause addressed "the tenure upon or under which it was to be held". Put differently, the habendum deals with the relationship between the possessor and the land—how the land is to be had—while the tenendum deals with the relationship between the possessor and his immediately superior lord—how the land is to be held. The obsolescence of land tenure, however, renders this distinction mostly historical and academic.

The provisions of the habendum clause must agree with those stated in the granting clause. For example, if the grantor conveys a time share interest or an interest less than fee simple absolute, the habendum clause would specify the owner's rights as well as how those rights are limited (a specific time frame or certain prohibited activities, for instance). Many states, such as Pennsylvania, require a deed to have a habendum clause in order for the deed to be officially recorded and recognized by the Recorder of Deeds.

Habendum clauses are also found in leases, particularly oil and gas leases. The habendum clause can define how long the interest granted will extend. Most oil and gas leases provide for a primary and secondary term. During the primary term the lessee can hold the lease without producing. The secondary term is usually "so long thereafter as oil and gas is produced in paying quantities."

References

Oil and gas law
Real property law
Leasing